Derrick G. Curtis is an American politician who has served as the alderman of Chicago's 18th ward since 2015. He became the  Democratic committeeman of the ward in 2011 after Lona Lane stepped down from that position. Curtis had previously been the ward's Streets and Sanitation superintendent, with more than 25 years of experience as a precinct captain. He ran against Lane in the 2015 aldermanic race and defeated her in a runoff. He won reelection in 2019, defeating Chuks Onyezia in the first round.

Curtis is regarded to be a City council ally of Mayor Lori Lightfoot. He had originally endorsed her for reelection in the 2023 Chicago mayoral election, but withdrew his endorsement after she did not reach out to Curtis after an incident in which Curtis accidentally shot himself while cleaning a gun.

See also
List of Chicago aldermen since 1923

References

External links
The city of Chicago's official site on the 18th ward

Chicago City Council members
Illinois Democrats
Year of birth missing (living people)
Living people
21st-century American politicians
African-American city council members in Illinois